The 1985 British motorcycle Grand Prix was the tenth round of the 1985 Grand Prix motorcycle racing season. It took place on the weekend of 2–4 August 1985 at the Silverstone Circuit.

Classification

500 cc

References

British motorcycle Grand Prix
British
Motorcycle Grand Prix